Diving most often refers to:
 Diving (sport), the sport of jumping into deep water
 Underwater diving, human activity underwater for recreational or occupational purposes
Diving or Dive may also refer to:

Sports 
 Dive (American football), a type of play in American football
 Diving (association football), a simulation of being fouled
 Diving (ice hockey), embellishing an infraction in an attempt to draw a penalty
 Sport diving (sport), competitive scuba diving using recreational techniques in a swimming pool
 Taking a dive, or match fixing, intentionally losing a match, especially in boxing

Film and television

Film

 Dive (film), a 1929 German silent film
 The Dive (1990 film), a Norwegian action thriller
 Dive! (film), a 2010 documentary film by Jeremy Sefert
 Dive, a 2014 New Zealand short film written and directed by Matthew J. Saville
 The Dive (2018 film), an Israeli film

TV
 Dive (TV series), a 2010 British drama
 "The Dive" (Hap and Leonard), a 2016 television episode

Music

Bands
 Dive (Belgian band), an electronic dance music project with an eponymous 1990 album
 Dive (Swedish band), a 1990s duo with an eponymous 1994 album
 DIIV, originally Dive, an American rock band

Albums
 Dive (Maaya Sakamoto album) or the title song, 1998
 Dive (Sarah Brightman album) or the title song, 1993
 Dive (Tycho album) or the title song, 2011
 Dive, by Burning Heads, 1994
 Dive, by I Am the Avalanche, 2020
 Dive, an EP by Milk & Bone, 2019

Songs
 "Dive" (Ed Sheeran song), 2017
 "Dive" (Nirvana song), 1992
 "Dive" (Steven Curtis Chapman song), 1999
 "Dive" (Usher song), 2012
 "Dive", by Beach House from 7, 2018
 "Dive", by BeForU, 2000
 "Dive", by Birds of Tokyo from Human Design, 2020
 "Dive", by Cardiacs from A Little Man and a House and the Whole World Window, 1988
 "Dive", by DC Talk from Supernatural, 1998
 "Dive", by the Dead Stars on Hollywood, 2005
 "Dive", by iKon from I Decide, 2020
 "Dive", by Kid Cudi from Man on the Moon III: The Chosen, 2020
 "Dive", by Saint Etienne from Home Counties, 2017
 "Diving" (song), by Bridgit Mendler, 2017
 "Diving", by 4 Strings, 2002

Places
 Dive (river), a river in France
 Dive, Thane, a village in Bhiwandi, Thane District, Maharashtra, India
 Lake Dive, a lake in Egmont National Park, New Zealand

Other uses
 Dive (aviation), a rapid descent by an aircraft ( also see dive bombing )
 Dive: The Medes Islands Secret, a 2010 video game
 Dive!!, a 2008 series of novels by Eto Mori
 Dive! (restaurant), a defunct restaurant in Los Angeles, California, US
 Dive bar, a type of bar or pub
 Daeva or Dive, a demon in Persian mythology

People
 Bradshaw Dive (1865–1946), New Zealand politician
 Caroline Dive (born 1962), British cancer pharmacologist
 Mollie Dive (1913–1997), Australian cricketer
 Dive Downes (1652–1709), Irish bishop

See also
 Dive Dive, a British rock band
 "Dive! Dive! Dive!", a 1990 song by Bruce Dickinson
 Diver (disambiguation)
 Dives (disambiguation)
 Divi (disambiguation)